Durban Ice Arena is an multi-purpose complex located in the golden mile of Durban, KwaZulu-Natal, South Africa. The complex is composed of an ice rink, convention center, exhibition halls and meeting rooms.  The Durban Ice Arena is considered one of Durban's most iconic and historic recreational facilities.  Opening its entryways in 2015, The Durban Ice Arena has turned into a firm most loved in media outlets, to a great extent because of its position inside Durban's Golden Mile and nearness to lodgings, shorelines, Durban's vacation spots and milestones. The Durban Ice Arena offers a large group of group building works out, birthday parties, bunch parties, school occasions and trips, ice appears, ice hockey exercises and ice skating/figure skating exercises all under one rooftop; making a charming snicker a-minute affair for all.

References

External links
 

Sports venues in Durban
Convention centres in South Africa